The S-Phone system was a UHF duplex radiotelephone system developed during World War II for use by Special Operations Executive agents working behind enemy lines to communicate with friendly aircraft and coordinate landings and the dropping of agents and supplies. The system was composed of a "Ground" transceiver, designed by Captain Bert Lane, and an "Air" transceiver designed by Major Hobday, both of the Royal Signals.

Description
The "Ground" set - which was to be used by agents on the ground - weighed about  including batteries and was typically worn attached to its operator with two canvas straps. It was a highly directional unit which required the operator to face the path of the aircraft. While the S-Phone provided directional information to the pilot it gave no range information, although a pilot could tell when he was directly over the "Ground" operator because at that point no communication was possible.

The primary purpose of the S-Phone was not navigational as such; rather, it was to provide a reasonably secure channel for coded conversation between staff officers based in London and agents in the field, allowing for the exchange of orders and information. The security of a circuit was sometimes tested by using an officer who could recognize whether a voice was actually that of the agent who was supposedly speaking to him.

It was designed in late 1942, using some of the component parts of the Wireless Set No.37.

Use of the phone is shown in the post-war docu-drama Now It Can Be Told (aka School_for_Danger, 1946) on YouTube.

See also
Joan-Eleanor a similar system developed for the OSS

Specifications

General
Frequency: 337 MHz (TX) / 380 MHz (RX)
Output Power: 0.1 to 0.2 W

Notes

British military radio
World War II British electronics
Military radio systems